Lester Levy  (born 1954) is a South African-born business leader, adjunct professor, and medical doctor based in Auckland, New Zealand. He chairs a number of large boards in New Zealand's largest city.

Early life and education
Levy grew up in a small town near Sharpeville, South Africa. He was six years old when the Sharpeville massacre occurred, and the event formed many of his basic life philosophies, e.g. he is wary of authority, distrustful of ideology, and does not have a desire to fit in. His interest in New Zealand was raised when he did a project at school on Sir Edmund Hillary, who he regards as a hero. He studied at the University of the Witwatersrand to become a medical doctor, and graduated Bachelor of Medicine, Bachelor of Surgery (MBBCh).

Career
Levy was chief executive of MercyAscot Hospital Group (a private hospital in Auckland), the South Auckland Crown Health Enterprise, and the New Zealand Blood Service. He is chairman for the environmental and engineering consultancy Tonkin + Taylor. He has chaired the Health Research Council of New Zealand, a Crown agency responsible for managing the government's investment in health research, since January 2016. He has been an adjunct professor at the University of Auckland Business School since 2003. On 1 November 2012, Levy succeeded Mark Ford as chairman of Auckland Transport. His first chairmanship of a district health board was for the Waitemata DHB, a role that he took on in June 2009. He was later appointed chairman of the Auckland District Health Board. From December 2016, he was in addition the chairman of the Counties Manukau District Health Board. In December 2017, he resigned as chair of all three Auckland region DHBs. He had served the maximum period of service on the Waitematā DHB and left as all three DHBs should be chaired by the same person. The resignation also avoided a conflict of interest as he had been appointed by the Health Minister to the Ministerial Advisory Group on the Health System.

Recognition and personal life
In the 2013 New Year Honours, Levy was appointed a Companion of the New Zealand Order of Merit for services to health and education.

He moved to New Zealand in 1978, and is married with three children.

References

1954 births
Living people
University of the Witwatersrand alumni
Companions of the New Zealand Order of Merit
South African emigrants to New Zealand
New Zealand healthcare chief executives
20th-century New Zealand businesspeople
20th-century New Zealand medical doctors
21st-century New Zealand businesspeople
21st-century New Zealand medical doctors
Auckland District Health Board members
Waitemata District Health Board members
Counties Manukau District Health Board members